Chinchwad is a locality in the city of Pune, India. The neighbourhood is home to extensive industry and is well known for its automotive, pharmaceutical, electrical, cons. products, electronics & hardware, aerospace and manufacturing units.

The locality has a museum dedicated to the Chapekar brothers who were active during the Indian independence movement. It has a Zoo dedicated to the poet Bahinabai Chaudhari known as The Nisargakavi Bahinabai Chaudhary Zoo. It has a science museum known as the Pimpri Chinchwad Science Park which has interactive exhibits, automotive models & a 3.5-acre park with sculptures.

Demographics
The main and the most spoken language of the city is Marathi. Hindi is the second most spoken language, followed by English. Due to a surfeit of IT companies in the adjacent suburb of Hinjawadi and automobile companies in the city itself, the city is home to diverse ethnic groups.

Geography
Chinchwad is located at a height of 570 m (1,870 ft) above sea level on the western margin of the Deccan plateau. It lies at 18° 37" North latitude and 73° 48" East longitude.

Chinchwad is situated on the Pavna river which is a tributary of the Bhima River.

History
The city of Chinchwad has been famous being the birthplace of the freedom fighters Chapekar brothers. The historic Morya Gosavi Ganpati Mandir, built in the 15th century and the Morya Gosavi Samadhi Mandir is situated in Gandhi Peth of old Chinchwad or Chinchwadgaon region.

With rapid industrialization & urbanization in 1990s, the population of Chinchwad started growing gradually. Chinchwad hosts companies like SKF, Tata Motors, Cotton Greaves, Premier,KSB and many other companies. Chinchwad has prominent & well developed residential pockets namely Bijalinagar, Premlok Park, Udyognagar, Tanajinagar, Keshavnagar, Shahunagar & Sambhajinagar. Empire Estate & Queenstown are popular residential complexes in Chinchwad. With the opening of Elpro City Square near Chaphekar Chowk in 2019, a one-stop shopping & entertainment destination, Chinchwad has become a self-sufficient & upmarket suburb of Pune. It also has malls namely Premier Plaza Mall, Aishwaryam One, Gems Crystal Mall & has stores of Star Bazaar & DMart too. With the onset of Metro along the Old Mumbai-Pune highway, various land parcels of industries are being redeveloped into luxurious residential complexes & business parks.

Chinchwad has many recreational spaces like Jijau Paryatan Kendra, Bird Valley, Nisargkavi Bahinabai Chaudhary Zoo, Pimpri Chinchwad Krida Udyan, BharatRatna Atal Bihari Vajpayee Udyan, Joggers Park, Science Park and many other small gardens. Ramkrushna More Natyagruha is a spacious auditorium in Chinchwad.

Culture

Festivities and Celebrations 
Ganesh Chaturthi is celebrated with a lot of rigour and joy. Dasara is also one of the important festivals. Not only Ganesh Chaturthi, every Chaturthi there is a celebration at Morya Gosavi temple and a Chaturthi bazaar along the streets in Gandhi Peth.

Performing Arts 
Chinchwad holds a Sankashti Chaturthi Sangeet Sabha. It is managed and organized by the Anaahat Sangeet Academy at the Mangalmurti Wada.

The PCMC Administration holds the annual 'Swarsagar Cultural Festival' every year either in Sai Udyan (Sambhajinagar) or Nigdi Pradhikaran area. Artists like Pandit Jasraj, Gundecha Brothers, Niladri Kumar, Mahesh Kale, Kaushiki Chakraborty, Rajendra Gangani, Kishori Amonkar, Vijay Ghate, Rakesh Chaurasia, Ulhas Kashalkar, Suresh Talwalkar, Saleel Kulkarni, Sandeep Khare, Ghulam Mustafa Khan, Purbayan Chatterjee, Rahul Deshpande, Shridhar Phadke, Sawani Shende- Sathaye, Ajay Pohankar, Upendra Bhat, Suhas Vyas have performed there.

In addition to it, the Morya Gosavi Devasthan Trust also holds the 'Morya Gosavi Samadhi Sangeet Mahotsav' wherein Indian classical musicians have performed.

The Vasantrao Deshpande Memorial Foundation and the Anindo Chatterjee Tabla Foundation annually present classical music festivals in the city.

Prominent Performing Arts Venues 
The Pimpri-Chinchwad Municipal Corporation maintains several theatres, including The Ramkrushna More Auditorium, Acharya Atre Rangmandir, Kashidham Mangal Karyalaya, Autocluster Hall, Anu Aga Hall, Natasamrat Nilu Phule Rangmandir, and Ankushrao Landge Natyagruha.

The Ramkrushna More Auditorium was recently renovated.

Education

Schools 

St. Andrew's High School , Chinchwad
 Podar International School, Chinchwad (CBSE)
Blossom Public School (CBSE)
City Pride School, Nigdi
Creative Academy School, Nigdi
Podar International School, Kharalwadi, Pimpri (ICSE)
Dheeraj International School, Pune
Shri Shri Ravishankar School, Moshi
 City International School, Morwadi, Pimpri
VIBGYOR Roots and Rise ,Chinchwad
 Elpro International School, Chinchwad
Rasiklal Dhariwal International School 
 Sau. Tarabai Shankarlal Mutha Kanya Prashala ( Jain Vidyalaya)
Shrimati Parvatibai Vidyalaya (MSS Highschool), Chinchwad

Clinics and Hospitals 
 Aditya Birla Memorial Hospital
 Niramay Hospital
Moraya Multispeciality Hospital
 Lokmanya Hospital (Nigdi)
 Pharande Dental Clinic
 Swami Samarth Hospital
 YCM Hospital (Government)
 7 Orange Hospital
Brahmachaitanya Superspeciality Hospital
Matruchaya Hospital
Lokmanya Holistic Cancer Care & Research Centre

Transport
Chinchwad is well connected by road, rail and air. The nearest airport is Pune Airport, with the Maharashtra government planning to set up a new airport in Purandar. Pune – Lonavla suburban local trains run through this area. The railway station for this area is Chinchwad Railway Station. It has two State Transport Bus stands- Pimpri-Chinchwad Bus Stand at Vallabhnagar and near Chinchwad Station.  Pune Mahanagar Parivahan Mahamandal Limited (formed by merger of PCMT and PMT) operates the public transport system in this area. The Maharashtra government has proposed metro connectivity to Chinchwad under the Pune Metro project. A Rainbow BRTS system is also active in this area with the main bus station named after Ashok Kamte.

See also 
 Pune
 Pimpri-Chinchwad
 List of roads in Pune
 Morya Gosavi

References

External links
 Pimpri Chinchwad Municipal Corporation Website

Cities and towns in Pune district
 
Twin cities